Men's tournament in beach handball was one of the invitational events in at the 2001 World Games in Akita. It was played from 23 to 25 August. The competition took place at Honjō Marina in Honjō, Japan.

Competition format
A total of 6 teams entered the competition. In preliminary stage they play round-robin tournament. The best four teams advances to the semifinals.

Results

Preliminary stage

Semifinals

Fifth place match

Bronze medal match

Gold medal match

Final ranking

References

External links
 Results on IWGA website

Beach handball at the 2001 World Games
Yurihonjō